Shanghai Cathedral may refer to:
St. Ignatius Cathedral of Shanghai
Holy Trinity Cathedral, Shanghai